The Outstanding Manilan Award, also known as the Outstanding Manilan Medallion of Honor, is conferred annually on recipients in fields including business, communications, diplomacy, finance, public service and spiritual leadership. It is given out by the City of Manila. The award was established in 1980.

Honorees
Recipients in 1995 included:
 ambassador Alfonso Yuchengco

Recipients in 1999 included:
 Elmer Jamias of the Philippine National Police

The ten 2011 recipients were:
Father Jose S. Arcilla, SJ
Director General Raul M. Bacalzo of the Philippine National Police
CEO Miguel G. Belmonte of the Philippine Star newspaper
Associate Justice Conchita Carpio-Morales of the Philippine Supreme Court
CEO Felipe L. Gozon of GMA Network
Nina Lim-Yuson
Presiding Justice Andres Reyes Jr. of the Philippine Court of Appeals
Chairman Andrew L. Tan of Megaworld Corporation
Ambassador Bienvenido Tantoco Sr.
Executive Vice President Emilio C. Yap III of the Manila Bulletin newspaper

Recipients in 2014 included:
 entertainer and talent manager German Moreno

The ten 2015 recipients were:
 city electrician Lorenzo B. Alconera
 entertainer Vice Ganda
 Senator Robert S. Jaworski
 Associate Justice Carmelita Salandanan Manahan of the Philippine Court of Appeals
 biotechnologist Edgar A. Maranan
 Mercedes S. Pascual of Arranque Market
 environmentalist Robert Y. So
 Senior Deputy City Prosecutor Eufrocina A. Sulla
 playwright Vincent Maniquiz Tañada
 Solar Entertainment chairman William Teng

Recipients in 2016 included:
 Mike Enriquez of Radio GMA Network (RGMA)

The nine 2017 recipients were:
Senator Sonny Angara
actress Boots Anson-Roa
architect Juan Arellano
fashion designer Ben Farrales
puppeteer Amelia Lapeña-Bonifacio
landscape sculptor Ramon Orlina
co-founder Socorro Ramos of the National Book Store
filmmaker and indigenous people's rights advocate Auraeus Solito
educator, linguist and writer Patrocinio Villafuerte

References

Awards established in 1980
Civil awards and decorations
Philippine awards
Municipal awards
Culture in Manila
1980 establishments in the Philippines
Manila-related lists